Aporophyla canescens is a moth of the family Noctuidae. It was described by Philogène Auguste Joseph Duponchel in 1826. It is found in Italy, Switzerland, Slovenia, Croatia, Albania, Bosnia and Herzegovina, Serbia, North Macedonia, Greece, Turkey, Israel, Portugal, Russia, as well as on Sardinia, Corsica, Sicily, Malta and Crete.

The wingspan is 40–45 mm. Adults have been recorded on wing from August to November.
The larvae feed on Asphodelus and Narcissus species.

References

External links

"Aporophyla canescens (Duponchel, 1826)". Insecta.pro. Retrieved February 4, 2020.
Lepiforum e.V.

Moths described in 1826
Aporophyla
Moths of Europe
Insects of Turkey
Moths of the Middle East
Taxa named by Philogène Auguste Joseph Duponchel